José Gomes Pinheiro Machado (8 May 1851 – 8 September 1915) was a Brazilian republican politician. He fought for the establishment of the Republic in Brazil and for its consolidation. 

He fought on the republican side in the Federalist Revolution (Revolução Federalista), commanding the North Division (Divisão do Norte) and winning a victory over the monarchist forces at the battle of Passo Fundo in 1894.

He was a senator for the state of Rio Grande do Sul from 1890 until his assassination in 1915.

Ancestry

See also
History of Brazil (1889–1930)
Senate of Brazil

References

External links
List of Brazilian senators of the República Velha - (1889-1930) 

1858 births
1915 deaths
Assassinated Brazilian politicians
People murdered in Rio de Janeiro
Members of the Federal Senate (Brazil)
People from Rio Grande do Sul
Conservative Republican Party politicians